Directorate General of Immigration & Passports (or DGIP) is a department under the control of the Interior Secretary of Pakistan. It is responsible to deal with all the issues of Pakistani citizenship, passports and visas.

References

External links 
 DGIP's official website

Pakistan federal departments and agencies
Foreign relations of Pakistan
Ministry of Interior (Pakistan)
Immigration to Pakistan